In England, Sites of Special Scientific Interest (SSSIs) are designated by Natural England, which is responsible for protecting England's natural environment. Designation as an SSSI gives legal protection to the most important wildlife and geological sites.

As of April 2020, there are 118 SSSIs in Hampshire, of which 107 are designated for their biological interest, 5 for their geological interest, and 6 for both interests.

Key

Interest
B = site of biological interest
G = site of geological interest

Public access
FP = access to footpaths through the site only
No = no public access to site
PP = public access to part of site
Yes = public access to all or most of the site

Other classifications
GCR = Geological Conservation Review site
HIWWT = Hampshire and Isle of Wight Wildlife Trust
LNR = Local nature reserve
NCR = Nature Conservation Review site
NNR = National nature reserve
NT =  National Trust
Ramsar = Ramsar site, an internationally important wetland site
RHPG = Register of Historic Parks and Gardens of Special Historic Interest in England
SAC = Special Area of Conservation
SM = Scheduled monument
SPA = Special Protection Area under the European Union Directive on the Conservation of Wild Birds

Sites

See also

List of local nature reserves in Hampshire
Hampshire and Isle of Wight Wildlife Trust

Notes

References

Sources

 
Hampshire
Sites of Special Scientific Interest